Will to Power is the tenth studio album by Swedish melodic death metal band Arch Enemy, released on 8 September 2017 via Century Media Records. This is the first album to feature guitarist Jeff Loomis who joined the band in November 2014. It is also the first Arch Enemy album to feature a song with clean singing as lead vocals; the song, "Reason to Believe", is referred to as "their first ever, largely clean-sung power ballad."

Reception

Ross Baker of Terrorizer gave the album a moderate rating, and wrote, "'Will To Power' doesn't see a dramatic stylistic shift from melodic death metal, but Michael Amott and company flex their muscles and experiment a bit on this tenth release."

Accolades
Metal Hammer magazine ranked Will to Power at #40 on its list of 100 Best Albums of 2017.

At the 2017 Burrn! magazine awards, the album won Best Album and Best Artwork, and the song "The World Is Yours" won Best Tune.

Track listing

Note

Personnel

Arch Enemy
 Alissa White-Gluz – vocals, lyrics handwriting
 Jeff Loomis – guitar
 Michael Amott – guitar, production
 Sharlee D'Angelo – bass
 Daniel Erlandsson – drums, keyboards, programming, production, guitar and bass engineering

Additional musicians
 Ulf Janson – strings arrangement (12), conducting
 Henrik Janson – strings arrangement (12), conducting
 Stockholm Session Strings – strings performance
 Ulf Forsberg, Christian Bergqvist, Per Öman, Ulrika Jansson, Bo Söderström, Torbjörn Bernhardsson – violin
 Tony Bauer, Riikka Repo – viola
 Johanna Sjunnesson – cello
 Jens Johansson – keyboards (4, 9, 10)
 Christopher Amott – keyboards (6), guitars (6)

Technical personnel
 Alex Reisfar – front cover artwork
 Costin Chioreanu – booklet artwork, booklet layout
 Katja Kuhl – photography
 Tom Couture – photography
 Jens Bogren – mixing, mastering
 Johan Örnborg – drum engineering
 Tobias Strandvik – drum tech
 Rickard Bengtsson – lead guitar engineering
 Staffan Karlsson – vocal engineering and production
 Linn Fijal – string engineering

Charts

References

2017 albums
Arch Enemy albums
Century Media Records albums